Taksiseh-ye Olya (also Romanized as Tāksīseh-ye ‘Olyā) is a village in Margown Rural District, Margown County, Boyer-Ahmad County, Kohgiluyeh and Boyer-Ahmad Province, Iran. At the 2006 census, its population was 71, in 14 families.

References 

Populated places in Boyer-Ahmad County